The Sane Asylum is the debut album by the American thrash metal band Blind Illusion. It was originally released in 1988 through Combat Records. The album features guitarist Larry LaLonde and bassist Les Claypool before they went on to work on Primus and was co-produced by Metallica lead guitarist Kirk Hammett.

Track listing 
All songs written by Marc Biedermann.

Personnel 
Marc Biedermann – vocals, guitars, bass on "The Sane Asylum" and "Metamorphosis of a Monster", producer, mixing
Larry LaLonde – guitars
Les Claypool – bass
Mike Miner – drums

Additional musicians
Cristiana Lorenzo, Elisabetta Lorenzo, Francesca Lorenzo, Marisa Lorenzo, Michael Lorenzo, Jeff Wing.- backing vocals on "Metamorphosis of a Monster"

Production
Kirk Hammett – producer (uncredited)
Mark Needham – engineer, recording, mixing
Annamaria Scott – engineer, recording

References

External links 
Album page at MusicBrainz
Album page at Discogs

Blind Illusion albums
1988 debut albums
Combat Records albums